Dr Subhash Ramrao Bhamre  (born 11 September 1953) is an Indian politician and reelected in 17th Lok Sabha. He was a member of the 16th Lok Sabha. He represents the Dhule constituency of Maharashtra and is a member of the Bharatiya Janata Party (BJP) political party.

An oncologist by profession, Bhamre did his medical studies in Mumbai at Grant Medical College, JJ Hospital and Tata Cancer Hospital, and wrote a research paper on breast cancer for the International Cancer Conference in Hungary.

Bhamre, and Minister of State Bhagwat Karad, provided emergency medical aid to a passenger while flying onboard Air India Flight 443 from Delhi to Aurangabad on 17 June 2022.

Political career and background
 18 August 2019: Vice president  Maharashtra  BJP.
 16 May 2014: Elected to 16th Lok Sabha
 1 Sep 2014 onwards: Member, Standing Committee on Health and Family Welfare
 5 July 2016: Minister of State for Defence
 His mother was the first female MLA of Sakri Vidhan Sabha Constituency.
 1972: Gojarbai Ramrao Bhamre, Indian National Congress

References

Living people
1953 births
Bharatiya Janata Party politicians from Maharashtra
People from Dhule district
People from Dhule
People from Maharashtra
People from Jalgaon
Marathi politicians
Lok Sabha members from Maharashtra
India MPs 2014–2019
India MPs 2019–present
Narendra Modi ministry